Terry Kennedy (born 4 July 1996) is an Irish rugby union player who has played for the Ireland national rugby sevens team since 2016.

Kennedy was a member of the Irish team that won the silver medals of 2017 Rugby Europe Sevens Grand Prix Series. He also helped Ireland win the 2018 Moscow Sevens tournament — he scored two tries in the final as Ireland defeated Germany 28–7, and was the leading try scorer in the tournament overall with nine tries.

Kennedy scored a try in the final of the 2019 Hong Kong Sevens qualifier to help Ireland defeat Hong Kong 28–7 and qualify for the 2019–20 World Rugby Sevens Series. He was named as a member of the HSBC Dream Team, as well as being crowned the Top Try Scorer for the 2021–22 World Rugby Sevens Series.

In his youth, Kennedy played for the Ireland national under–20 team. He was a member of the under-20 squad that were runners up in the World Cup Final.  Kennedy plays his club rugby with St. Mary's College with whom he won the All-Ireland League 1B title in 2017.

Kennedy competed for Ireland at the 2022 Rugby World Cup Sevens in Cape Town. Kennedy won the 2022 World Rugby Men's Sevens Player of the Year.

References

1996 births
Living people
Irish rugby union players
Ireland international rugby sevens players
Leinster Rugby players
St Mary's College RFC players
Olympic rugby sevens players of Ireland
Rugby sevens players at the 2020 Summer Olympics